Doyle Edward Nix (May 30, 1933January 6, 2009) was an American football defensive back in the National Football League for the Green Bay Packers and Washington Redskins. He also was a member of the Los Angeles Chargers and Dallas Texans in the American Football League. He played college football at Southern Methodist University.

Early years
Nix attended Texas High School. He accepted a football scholarship from Southern Methodist University. He was a two-year starter and one of the offensive leaders of the team.

As a junior, he was second on the team with 12 receptions for 187 yards (15.6-yard avg.). He was a teammate of future Pro Football Hall of Famers Raymond Berry and Forrest Gregg.

Professional career

Green Bay Packers
Nix was selected by the Green Bay Packers in the 18th round (209th overall) of the 1955 NFL Draft. He had a successful rookie season at cornerback, while registering 5 interceptions. He spent the next two years out of football while serving his military service with the United States Air Force.

On March 4, 1958, he was traded along with cornerback John Petitbon to the Washington Redskins in exchange for wide receiver Steve Meilinger and defensive tackle J. D. Kimmel.

Washington Redskins
In 1958, he played in 11 games after missing time with a broken hand. The next year, he played in only 8 games, missing time as a designated healthy scratch.

Dallas Cowboys
Nix was selected by the Dallas Cowboys in the 1960 NFL Expansion Draft, but did not make the regular season roster.

Los Angeles Chargers (AFL)
On September 22, 1960, he was signed as a free agent by the Los Angeles Chargers of the American Football League. He was a part of the franchise's inaugural season and posted 4 interceptions, while helping the team reach the 1960 American Football League Championship Game.

On August 22, 1961, he was traded to the Houston Oilers along with linebacker Ron Botchan in exchange for two draft choices.

Dallas Texans (AFL)
In 1961, he played with the Dallas Texans of the American Football League and registered 3 interceptions.

References

1933 births
2009 deaths
People from Texarkana, Texas
Players of American football from Texas
American football defensive backs
SMU Mustangs football players
Green Bay Packers players
Washington Redskins players
Los Angeles Chargers players
Dallas Texans (AFL) players
American Football League players
United States Air Force officers
Military personnel from Texas